Soilmec S.p.A. is an Italian manufacturer of construction equipment belonging to the Trevi Group established in 1969 in Cesena. Soilmec is distributed in more than 70 countries worldwide.

Soilmec manufactures drilling machinery to be used in the construction of pile foundations, and the drilling and servicing of oil, gas and water wells. The company has expanded into the manufacture of crawler cranes and tunnel boring machines.

The machinery produced by Soilmec is typically white with blue trim and the name SOILMEC is written in yellow text with a black outline.

Gallery

See also

List of Italian companies

External links
 Soilmec S.p.A website

Construction equipment manufacturers of Italy
Mining equipment companies
Engineering companies of Italy
Manufacturing companies established in 1969
Italian companies established in 1969
Italian brands